Barking! is a British children's television series that produced three series between October 2004 and February 2006. The show was originally broadcast on ITV1's children's slot CITV. It was nominated for Best Drama at the 11th British Academy Children's Awards.

All 20 episodes of Barking! were repeated frequently on the CITV channel between 2006 and 2013. In February 2018, a similar show Waffle the Wonder Dog was released on CBeebies.

Premise
The series stars Katy McGowan as Jezza Matthews, a teenage girl with a talking dog named Georgie, voiced by Will Mellor, who was given as a welcome gift by her stepfather, Greg (Charles Dale), when Jezza moved with her family to Devon. Jezza is the only person that knows that Georgie could talk, as they go out on adventures around the fictional town of Stonemoor in Devon, but Georgie always causes mischief and gets Jezza in for the blame, Jezza doesn't mind though as they are still close. Other major characters in the show included Jezza's mother, Pippa (Robin Weaver), and her stepbrothers Dan (Adam Scourfield) and Ollie (Tom Millner).

Cast
 Katy McGowan as Jezza
 Will Mellor as Georgie 
 Charles Dale as Greg
 Robin Weaver as Pippa
 Adam Scourfield as Dan
 Tom Millner as Ollie
 Linzey Cocker as Roxy

Production
The series was filmed in the small country market town of Boroughbridge in North Yorkshire.

It was created by Georgia Pritchett and produced by Pippa Brill. The title sequence and design was made and produced by Hello Charlie.

The song composers and producers for the opening sequence were Rob David and Dan Delor who also did composing for other programmes like documentaries for the BBC.

References

External links

 

ITV children's television shows
2004 British television series debuts
2006 British television series endings